Astrotischeria alcedoensis is a moth of the family Tischeriidae. It was described by Bernard Landry in 2004. It is found on the Galápagos Islands.

The larvae feed on Scalesia species. They mine the leaves of their host plant.

References

Moths described in 2004
Tischeriidae